The Łódź Voivodeship Sejmik is the regional legislature of the voivodeship of Łódź, Poland. It is a unicameral body consists of thirty-three councillors elected in free elections for a five-year term. The current chairperson of the assembly is Iwona Koperska.

The assembly elects the executive board that acts as the collective executive for the regional government, headed by the province's marshal. The current Executive Board is held by the Law and Justice party, headed by Marshal Grzegorz Schreiber.

The Regional Assembly meets in the Marshal's Office in Łódź City.

Districts 

Members of the Assembly are elected from five districts, serve five-year terms. Districts does not have the constituencies formal names. Instead, each constituency has a number and territorial description.

See also 

 Polish Regional Assembly
 Łódź Voivodeship

Charts

External links 
 (pl) Łódź Regional Assembly

Voivodeship assemblies in Poland
Assembly
Unicameral legislatures